The 2010 Abierto Internacional del Bicentenario Leon was a professional tennis tournament played on hard courts. It was part of the 2010 ATP Challenger Tour. It took place in León, Guanajuato, Mexico between 12 and 18 April 2010.

ATP entrants

Seeds

 Rankings are as of April 5, 2010.

Other entrants
The following players received wildcards into the singles main draw:
  Juan-Manuel Elizondo
  Daniel Garza
  Alfredo Moreno
  César Ramírez

The following players received entry from the qualifying draw:
  Kaden Hensel
  Travis Rettenmaier
  Roman Valent

Champions

Singles

 Santiago González def.  Michał Przysiężny, 3–6, 6–1, 7–5

Doubles

 Santiago González /  Vasek Pospisil def.  Kaden Hensel /  Adam Hubble, 3–6, 6–3, [10–8]

References
2010 Draws
Official website
ITF search 

Abierto Internacional del Bicentenario Leon
Abierto Internacional del Bicentenario Leon
Internacional del Bicentenario Leon
Torneo Internacional Challenger León